Ruben Moreira (July 27, 1922 – May 21, 1984) was a Puerto Rican comic book artist and writer best known for his work on Tarzan and as a DC Comics artist.

Biography
Ruben Moreira moved with his mother to New York City when he was four. He started working for Fiction House's Planet Comics on Reef Ryan in July 1942. He later contributed to the Fiction House titles Fight Comics between August and October 1943, to Rangers Comics between October 1943 and August 1944, and to Wings Comics from December 1943 until April 1944. He took over the Tarzan Sunday page from Burne Hogarth in 1945. He was its sole artist and writer until 1947, using the pen name Rubimor. Burne Hogarth then again took over the series.

Later in the 1940s, he created Her Highness and Silk for the Quality Comics publication Hit Comics, and worked on I Confess for the whole run from June 1948 until December 1949 in Rangers Comics.

In 1949, he co-created DC Comics' Roy Raymond, on which he was the main artist for all issues until 1961. Later, he worked for them on titles like The Adventures of Alan Ladd and Wonder Woman. His work also often appeared in House of Mystery and House of Secrets. In 1959, he created Rip Hunter together with Jack Miller.

He also worked for other publishers in this period as well. He collaborated on Warren Tufts' Casey Ruggles for a while.

He went back to Puerto Rico in 1958 and ended his comics career in 1962. He died from cancer in 1984.

A Rubimor Sunday page is part of the Library of Congress American Treasures collection.

Moreira's characters
Moreira is credited with creating at least three characters: Black Terror, Puzzler and Beggar King.

References

External links
Biography at Lambiek Comiclopedia
TARZAN by RUBIMOR (Ruben MOREIRA) on www.comicartfans.com 

Puerto Rican comics artists
Golden Age comics creators
1922 births
1984 deaths